Saved! is a 2004 American independent satirical black comedy film directed by Brian Dannelly, and starring Jena Malone, Mandy Moore, Macaulay Culkin, Patrick Fugit, Eva Amurri, Martin Donovan, and Mary-Louise Parker. Its plot follows a teenage girl (Malone) at a Christian high school who has sex with her boyfriend in an attempt to "cure" him of his homosexuality; she becomes pregnant as a result and is ostracized by her schoolmates. Filmed in British Columbia, the film had its theatrical release on May 28, 2004. Saved! was considered a sleeper hit, grossing over $9 million domestically following a platform release through Metro-Goldwyn-Mayer. The film received mixed reviews from critics, with many remarking on its blend of religious satire with elements of the contemporary teen film.

Plot
Devout Evangelical Christian Mary Cummings is entering her senior year at American Eagle Christian High School near Baltimore. She and her friends Hilary Faye and Veronica have formed a girl group called the Christian Jewels. One afternoon, while swimming in his pool, Mary's boyfriend Dean Withers confesses to her that he suspects he is gay. In shock, Mary hits her head, and has a vision in which Jesus tells her to help Dean. Believing Jesus will forgive her, Mary loses her virginity to Dean in an attempt to restore his heterosexuality.

Dean is sent to Christian treatment center Mercy House after his parents find gay pornography in his bedroom. The news shocks and disgusts Mary's friends, aside from Hilary's sardonic, paraplegic brother Roland. Mary soon discovers she is pregnant with Dean's child. Because her due date is after graduation, she opts to hide the pregnancy from her classmates, as well as her mother Lillian, who is covertly dating the school's divorced principal Pastor Skip. Feeling forsaken by Jesus and saddened by her peers' reaction to Dean's sexuality, Mary begins questioning her faith. An enraged Hilary ousts Mary from the Jewels and replaces her with unpopular student Tia. Hilary, Veronica, and Tia later accost Mary in the street and attempt to perform an exorcism on her. Mary fights back, and Hilary strikes her with a Bible.

By Christmas time, rebellious Jewish student Cassandra is the only one of Mary's peers who has discovered her pregnancy. Mary befriends Cassandra and Roland, who are now dating, while ostracized by the rest of their peers. Meanwhile, Skip's son, Patrick, attempts to pursue an evasive Mary, much to Hilary's chagrin. Cassandra and Roland retaliate against Hilary's constant harassment of them by uploading photos of a young, overweight Hilary to the school's computer system. The following day, the school is vandalized with obscene, anti-religious graffiti. Skip suspects Mary, Cassandra, and Roland, and discovers empty spray-paint cans in their lockers planted by Hilary, along with a sonogram of Mary's baby, exposing her pregnancy.

Cassandra is expelled while Mary and Roland are banned from the impending prom. Skip threatens to end his relationship with Lillian if she does not send Mary to Mercy House. Meanwhile, Roland discovers more empty spray-paint cans in Hilary's car, as well as receipts from purchasing them. Planning to expose Hilary with this evidence, Mary, Roland, and Cassandra crash the prom along with Patrick, who takes Mary as his date. Hilary tries to have them ejected, but Roland confronts her with the receipts for the spray-paint. Tia, tired of Hilary's lies and hypocrisy, also attests her guilt to Skip, having discovered additional receipts bearing Hilary's signature.

A humiliated Hilary storms outside while Dean arrives with his boyfriend Mitch and other residents of Mercy House. They are met by Mary and Patrick in the school foyer, where she reveals her pregnancy to Dean. Skip attempts to banish the Mercy House residents, but they refuse. Patrick and Mary attempt to argue with Skip, but their altercation is interrupted by Hilary driving recklessly through the parking lot and ultimately crashing into the school's effigy of Jesus. She then tearfully expresses remorse for her behavior and is comforted by Cassandra as Mary abruptly goes into labor and is taken to the hospital.

At the hospital, Mary gives birth to a daughter. Skip arrives with flowers and contemplates going inside. As a nurse takes a photo of Mary, Dean, Roland, Cassandra, Patrick, Mitch, Lillian, and the baby, Mary explains in a voice-over that she has returned to believing in a God who loves and helps the ones that love and help others in need.

Cast
 Jena Malone as Mary Cummings, a quiet girl who attempts to help her gay ex-boyfriend, Dean, by giving him her virginity, unintentionally becoming pregnant.
 Mandy Moore as Hilary Faye Stockard, the leader of the Christian Jewels and initially Mary's best friend.  She is an extremely devout conservative Christian, though very self-righteous and overbearing, much to the annoyance of others. She reluctantly cares for her handicapped brother, Roland, keeping him on a tight leash.
 Macaulay Culkin as Roland Stockard, Hilary Faye's sardonic brother. He fell out of a tree as a child, leaving him a paraplegic. Unlike his sister, he does not identify as Christian.
 Eva Amurri as Cassandra Edelstein, the only Jewish girl to ever attend American Eagle. She is naturally rebellious and devious on the outside, but when she becomes friends with Mary and lovers with Roland, her true colors show in that she is actually very loyal and open.
 Patrick Fugit as Patrick Wheeler, the son of Pastor Skip, the school's principal, and Mary's love interest.
 Elizabeth Thai as Veronica; adopted from Vietnam by a pair of missionaries, she is the third Christian Jewel.
 Chad Faust as Dean Withers, Mary's boyfriend at the beginning of the film. He comes out to Mary as gay.
 Martin Donovan as Pastor Skip Wheeler, the principal of American Eagle. A superficially pious and devout minister who is cheating on his wife, Pastor Skip tries to remain "young and cool".
 Heather Matarazzo as Tia; somewhat of an outsider in the beginning, Tia takes Mary's place in the Jewels when Mary is kicked out. Her father has a drinking problem which disturbs her deeply.
 Mary-Louise Parker as Lillian Cummings, Mary's mother, a widow from an early age.
 Kett Turton as Mitch, a fellow gay resident of Mercy House who becomes Dean's boyfriend.
 Dave Rosin, guitarist of the Canadian pop-rock band Hedley, appears as the guitarist for the band playing in the prom scene.

Production
Director and co-writer Brian Dannelly based much of the film on things he had experienced and witnessed while attending a Baptist Christian high school. "I would even go so far as to say that everything in the film is something I experienced or researched," Dannelly stated. "I didn’t try to make up stuff." Though set in Maryland, Saved! was filmed in Vancouver, British Columbia, Canada.

Release

Box office
After premiering at the Sundance Film Festival in January 2004, Saved! had a platform limited release in the United States on 20 screens, beginning May 28, 2004. The film grossed $345,136 during its opening weekend, and an additional 11 screens were added the following weekend. After the film had grossed an additional $340,343 during its second weekend, its release platform expanded to 589 screens on June 11, and it reached number 9 at the U.S. box office. By the conclusion of its theatrical run in August 2004, the film grossed approximately $9 million domestically, and was considered a sleeper hit. It grossed an additional $1.2 million in foreign markets, totaling $10.1 million worldwide.

Reception
Saved! received generally positive reviews from critics. At critics aggregator site Rotten Tomatoes, the film holds a 61% rating of 88 positive reviews against 57 negative ones, with an average rating of 6.12/10. The website's critical consensus reads: "A satirical teen comedy that, unfortunately, pulls its punches."

Roger Ebert of the Chicago Sun-Times gave the film 3 and a half out of 4 stars and praised the film despite commenting that it follows formulaic tropes of other teen films, adding that it has a "political message": 

Ken Fox of TV Guide gave the film three of five stars: 

The Christian Science Monitors David Sterritt gave the film a favorable review, writing: 

Sean Axmaker of the Seattle Post-Intelligencer wrote of the film: 

Other critics, however, criticized the film for alleged anti-Christian views. Slant Magazine was overwhelmingly negative on this issue, giving the film only half a star out of five and calling it the worst movie of the year.

Home media
A DVD version of the film is available from Metro-Goldwyn-Mayer with commentary from Dannelly, Urban and co-producer Sandy Stern as well as commentary by Jena Malone and Mandy Moore; theatrical trailer, access to deleted scenes, and some bloopers. Olive Films reissued a Blu-ray edition of the film in 2016.

Stage musical

Playwrights Horizons produced a musical version of the film in 2008. Music and lyrics are by Michael Friedman with the book and lyrics by two-time Olivier Award nominee John Dempsey and Rinne Groff. The musical opened on June 3, 2008 at Playwrights Horizons and closed on June 22, 2008. The cast included Aaron Tveit, Celia Keenan-Bolger, John Dossett, Julia Murney, Devyn Rush, Curtis Holbrook, and Mary Faber.

References

External links

 
 
 

2004 films
American coming-of-age comedy-drama films
American LGBT-related films
LGBT-related satirical films
LGBT-related coming-of-age films
Films about anti-LGBT sentiment
American teen comedy films
Evangelicalism in popular culture
Films about LGBT and Christianity
Films about paraplegics or quadriplegics
Films critical of Christianity and Christians
Films set in Maryland
Films shot in Vancouver
American pregnancy films
Films about proms
Religious comedy films
Teenage pregnancy in film
United Artists films
Films critical of religion
Films scored by Christophe Beck
Teensploitation
2000s satirical films
2004 independent films
2004 directorial debut films
2004 comedy-drama films
2004 LGBT-related films
2000s English-language films
2000s American films